Ronald Ferguson or Ron Ferguson may refer to:
 Ron Ferguson (footballer) (born 1957), English footballer
 Ron Ferguson (politician), (born 1986), Ohio state representative
 Ronald Ferguson (polo) (1931–2003), English polo manager
 Ronald Ferguson (economist) (born 1950), American economist
 Ronald Ferguson Thomson (1830–1888), British diplomat
 Ronald Craufurd Ferguson (1773–1841), Scottish army officer and Member of Parliament